1000 Places to See Before You Die is a documentary series that was shown on the Travel Channel as well as Discovery HD Theater (now Velocity HD) in 2007.  The show, hosted by Albin and Melanie Ulle, travels around the world to showcase some of the Earth's vast beauty.  The program also explores the diverse cultures of several amazing countries and approximately 100 of the 1,000 Places from the book, with an eye towards unearthing local charms and traditions.

Discovery HD Theater series (TV video)
Collection 1
 1,000 Places to See Before You Die - Alaska
 1,000 Places to See Before You Die - Australia
 1,000 Places to See Before You Die - Brazil
 1,000 Places to See Before You Die - France
 1,000 Places to See Before You Die - Hawaii
 1,000 Places to See Before You Die - Italy

Collection 2
 1,000 Places to See Before You Die - Cambodia
 1,000 Places to See Before You Die - Canada
 1,000 Places to See Before You Die - India
 1,000 Places to See Before You Die - Mexico
 1,000 Places to See Before You Die - Nepal
 1,000 Places to See Before You Die - Peru
 1,000 Places to See Before You Die - South Africa

See also
 1,000 Places to See in the USA and Canada Before You Die
 1,000 Places to See Before You Die

External links
 
 

2007 American television series debuts
2007 American television series endings
2000s American documentary television series
English-language television shows
Travel Channel original programming
Travelogues